Wang Yijin (Chinese: 王艺瑾, born Wang Yunxuan (Chinese: 王韻宣) on December 25, 1996) also known by her English name Rita Wang,  is a Chinese film and television actress and singer. She was a member and lead vocalist of BonBon Girls 303 after placing third on Produce Camp 2020.The group disbanded on July 4th, 2022 and she resumed her activities as a solo artist and actress.

Early life 
Wang Yijin, whose real name is Wang Yunxuan mentioned that she was used to be overweight back in her childhood and early teenage years. She graduated from high school in Shandong Jinan Foreign Language School. She graduated from college, majoring in Musical Drama Arts and Theater in Central Academy of Drama. She also attended several courses in Beijing Dance Academy and finished her thesis during Produce Camp 2020.

Career 
Early 2000, The 5-year-old Wang Yijin co-hosted the children's program "Sunshine Express Lane" of Shandong Satellite TV with Da Bing and Da Tou (Liu Zichang), which was recognized by the audience. In addition, she also hosted the evening party of the local satellite TV.

Prior to signing up with Jaywalk in 2018, she was a theater actress.

On October 11, 2016, her solo single "Feng Hua Yuan Meng" was released, which is also the Chinese cheongsam meeting song.

In February 2019, she participated in the CCTV-15 music program Feng Hua National Music and sang the song Feng hua yuan Dream. Her acting career started in an urban family drama starring Zhang Jiayi, Yan Ni, and Zhao Jinmai in A Little Reunion as the roommate of Lin Miao Miao.

She also has a role in the series of Yang Mi and Vin Zhang in Storm Eye.

She then participated in the Tencent's Produce Camp 2020. She sang "I Like You" by Kit Chan as her audition for the vocal in the first episode, performed "Muttering" by Stefanie Sun with A+ Students (Jaywalk NewJoy Trainees). For the Group Battle, she performed "Magical" under LTG with Zhao Yue. For the Position Evaluation, she performed "The World Would Not Easily Collapse" under LTG for Vocal Group with Curley Gao. For the Concept Battle, she performed "Isolation" with Chen Zhouxuan and Aarif Rahman as the guest male senior who she had a special duet with. She performed Lady Gaga's Shallow for her solo performance during the finals, She sang Daisies by Katy Perry and for the Final Performance, she performed "Phoenix".  She finished in 3rd place debuting as a member of BonBon Girls 303 (A project girl group with a 2-year contract) under Wajijiwa Entertainment.

Discography

Singles

Filmography

Television series

Television shows

References

External links
 
 

1996 births
Living people
People from Jinan
Actresses from Jinan
Musicians from Jinan
Chinese women singers
Chinese television actresses
Chinese film actresses
Singers from Shandong
Actresses from Shandong
Produce 101 (Chinese TV series) contestants
BonBon Girls 303 members